Microxina is a genus of sponges belonging to the family Niphatidae.

The species of this genus are found in Southern South Hemisphere.

Species:

Microxina benedeni 
Microxina charcoti 
Microxina lanceolata 
Microxina myxa 
Microxina phakellioides 
Microxina sarai 
Microxina simplex 
Microxina subtilis

References

Sponges